Cercosaura ocellata, the ocellated tegu, is a species of lizard in the family Gymnophthalmidae. It is found in Brazil , Venezuela, Guyana, Suriname, French Guiana, Peru, Bolivia, Colombia, Argentina, and Paraguay.

References

Cercosaura
Reptiles described in 1830
Taxa named by Johann Georg Wagler